A constitutional referendum was held in Uruguay on 28 August 1994. The proposals were rejected by 69% of voters.

Proposals
The proposed amendments to the constitution were put forward by the General Assembly, passing in the Chamber of Deputies on 11 May with 62 of the 99 members voting in favour, and in the Senate on 8 July with 22 of the 30 members voting in favour. The amendments would split the vote for president, parliament and governors, set wages for councillors and the method of payment of pensions.

Results

Unevaluated votes were those cast by voters outside of their local polling station. They would have been examined after a court had decided on their validity, but as the result was already clear, they were not counted.

References

1994 referendums
1994 in Uruguay
Referendums in Uruguay
Welfare in Uruguay
Pension referendums
Constitutional referendums in Uruguay
August 1994 events in South America
Luis Alberto Lacalle